Maung Anom Football Club (simply known as Maung Anom) is an Indonesian football club based in Bandung, West Java. They currently compete in the Liga 3.

Founded in 2017 as Maung Anom FC, it is the reserve team of Persib Bandung, and currently plays in Liga 3, holding its home matches at the Siliwangi Stadium.

References

External links

Bandung
Sport in West Java
Football clubs in Indonesia
Football clubs in West Java
Association football clubs established in 2017
2017 establishments in Indonesia